Echo is a ballet made by New York City Ballet ballet master (subsequently ballet master in chief) Peter Martins to Michael Torke's Slate (1989). The premiere took place on 15 June 1989 at the New York State Theater, Lincoln Center. Echo was the third in a series of collaborations between the choreographer and composer.

Cast

Original  
  
Kyra Nichols
Heather Watts
Darci Kistler
Suzanne Farrell

Adam Luders
Jock Soto
Jeppe Mytskov
Robert Hill

See also  
Ash
Black and White
Ecstatic Orange

Articles  
Sunday NY Times by Anna Kisselgoff, July 7, 1991

Reviews 
 
NY Times by Anna Kisselgoff, June 17, 1989

NY Times by Anna Kisselgoff, January 7, 1990

Ballets by Peter Martins
Ballets by Michael Torke
1989 ballet premieres
New York City Ballet repertory